Chase M. Janes  (born March 2, 2001) is an American professional racing driver. He last competed part-time in the NASCAR Camping World Truck Series driving the No. 33 Chevrolet Silverado for Reaume Brothers Racing and the No. 46 Toyota Tundra for G2G Racing.

Racing career

Camping World Truck Series
Janes made his Camping World Truck Series debut in 2022 at the Martinsville Speedway running the No. 33 Toyota Tundra for Reaume Brothers Racing. On June 15, 2022, G2G Racing owner Tim Viens revealed that Janes would drive for his team in the race at Nashville in the No. 46 truck.

Motorsports career results

NASCAR
(key) (Bold – Pole position awarded by qualifying time. Italics – Pole position earned by points standings or practice time. * – Most laps led.)

Camping World Truck Series

 Season still in progress

References

External links
 

Living people
NASCAR drivers
Racing drivers from Indiana
Sportspeople from Fort Wayne, Indiana
2001 births